Legitimate Beef is the second album by Spongehead, released in 1990 through Community 3 Records.

Track listing

Personnel 
Adapted from the Legitimate Beef liner notes.

Spongehead
David Henderson – baritone saxophone, tenor saxophone, soprano saxophone, vocals
Doug Henderson – guitar, bass guitar, vocals
Mark Kirby – drums, vocals

Production and additional personnel
Albert Garzon – production
Scott Hull – engineering

Release history

References

External links 
 

1990 albums
Spongehead albums